Viscount  was a Japanese politician, cabinet minister and deputy prime minister, who lived in the Meiji and Taishō periods. Noted primarily for his role as finance minister, he was also the younger brother of Count Watanabe Chiaki.

Early life
Watanabe was born in 1846. in the hamlet of Tobori in Shinano Province, now part of Okaya, Nagano Prefecture, where his father was a samurai in the service of Takashima Domain. He lost his parents while still a small child and was raised by his grandparents and elder brother. After attending the domainal academy to study military arts, he was sent to Edo to enroll in the academy run by Sakuma Shōzan. However, after Sakuma's assassination, he stayed at the domain's Edo residence, where he studied the French language. In 1868, he was sent to Kyoto as part of the retinue of his daimyō, Suwa Tadaaya, who had been assigned guard duties at Kyoto Palace, and it was at this time that he first met Ōkubo Toshimichi, whom he refused entrance to the Palace on the grounds that his pass was not in order.

Early Meiji period
In 1871, following the Meiji Restoration, Watanabe and his brother were called to Tokyo, and were able to secure positions at the new Ministry of Popular Affairs  with Ōkubo’s assistance. In 1873, he joined the Ministry of the Treasury. However, with the Seikanron debate and issues caused by the Freedom and People's Rights Movement, Ōkubo called upon Watanabe as a troubleshooter for the Home Ministry, sending him a governor of Kōchi Prefecture and Tokushima Prefecture in 1876, and with the start of the Satsuma Rebellion, sending him as governor of Fukuoka Prefecture in 1877, and back to Kōchi in 1879. Ultimately unsuccessful in assisting Ōkubo, he resigned his posts and retired to seclusion in Kyoto, where he devoted his time to studies of French, German and English, as well as classical Latin and Greek. With the government reorganization of 1881, Watanabe was recalled to government service by Matsukata Masayoshi in 1882 as Chief of the Research Bureau of the Finance Ministry, followed by Budgetary Director in 1886 and Finance Secretary in 1888.

Cabinet Minister
Following Matsukata’s resignation in the aftermath of the election scandal precipitated by Shinagawa Yajirō in 1892, Watanabe was appointed Minister of Finance under the 2nd Itō Hirobumi administration. During his tenure, the government was in a budgetary deadlock, as the opposition parties demanded a large reduction in public spending, whereas the military was pushing for more warships. The impasse was only resolved through the personal intervention of Emperor Meiji, and Watanabe was replaced as Finance Minister by Matsukata on 17 March 1896, but returned to the same post from 27 August to 18 September of the same year. Watanabe was involved in establishment of the Committee on the Monetary System that was charged with the analysis of the best monetary system  for Japan's economy in the long run.

Watanabe also held the post of Communications Minister in 1895 under the 2nd Itō administration and also served as Itō’s vice premier.

In 1900, Watanabe became one of the founding organizers of the Rikken Seiyūkai political party. He was reappointed as Finance Minister under the 4th Itō administration in 1900–1901, despite having had a falling out with Itō earlier on the subject of political appointments. During his tenure, he attempted to impose an austerity budget, with implementation of a sugar tax and a liquor tax, and cutbacks in government enterprises. The measures passed the lower house, but were blocked by the upper house, resulting in another deadlocked Diet of Japan which was resolved only through his resignation.

Later years
Following his resignation, Watanabe largely retired from public life. He made a trip to Russia before the Russo-Japanese War of 1904-1905 and returned a strong proponent of the conflict, and was a leader in the opposition to the Treaty of Portsmouth. After suffering from a stroke, he retired to his villa in Azabu, Tokyo, and subsequently to Izu, where he died in 1919 at the age of 73. A lifelong bachelor, he adopted Chifuyu Watanabe the third son of his brother Chiaki as his heir. Watanabe wrote poems and prose as well as he played the Japanese harp, koto.

References

External links

20th-century Japanese politicians
1846 births
1919 deaths
Government ministers of Japan
Governors of Kochi Prefecture
Governors of Fukuoka Prefecture
Governors of Tokushima Prefecture
Kazoku
Ministers of Finance of Japan
People of Meiji-period Japan
Politicians from Nagano Prefecture
Rikken Seiyūkai politicians
Samurai